Lee Naylor may refer to:

 Lee Naylor (footballer) (born 1980), English footballer
 Lee Naylor (sprinter) (born 1971), Australian track and field athlete
 Lee Naylor (Emmerdale), a fictional character in Emmerdale